Pittosporum taitense is a species of plant in the Pittosporaceae family. It is endemic to French Polynesia.

References

Endemic flora of French Polynesia
taitense
Least concern plants
Taxonomy articles created by Polbot